Early Rebel Recordings: 1962–1971 is a compilation album by the progressive bluegrass band Country Gentlemen. A collection of 110 songs, 5 of them previously unreleased, divided on 4 CD's, the album includes various lineups of the early Country Gentlemen. It includes the first and second classic lineup, while adding Dobro of Mike Auldridge or second guitar by Pete Kuykendall.

Track listing

Disc 1
 Christmas Time Back Home (Duffey, Streeter) 3:09
 Heavenward Bound (Duffey) 2:17
 I Am Weary, Let Me Rest (Pete Kuykendall) 2:38
 Sad And Lonesome Day (Traditional) 2:33
 The Bluebirds Are Singing for Me (John Duffey, Pete Kuykendall) 2:24
 The White Rose (Traditional) 2:34
 The Gentleman Is Blue (Eddie Adcock, John Duffey) 3:36
 Philadelphia Lawyer (Woody Guthrie) 2:59
 Spanish Two Step (Bob Wills) 2:35
 Bringing Mary Home (Duffey) 3:00
 The Convict And The Rose (Chapin, King) 2:38
 Banks of the Ohio (Traditional) 3:00
 Down Where the River Bends (Jack Anglin, Peck, Johnnie Wright) 2:29
 Battle Hymn of the Republic (Ward, Steffe) 1:46
 This World's No Place to Live (Duffey, Streeter) 2:48
 Uncle Joe (Eddie Adcock) 2:58
 Northbound (Eddie Adcock) 2:16
 I Let the Light Shine Down (Swan) 1:54
 Girl From the North Country (Bob Dylan) 3:42
 Cold Wind A Blowing (John Duffey, Hill) 2:14
 Jingle Bells (James Lord Pierpont) 1:25
 Silent Night (Franz Gruber, Mohr) 1:51
 We Three Kings (Hopkins) 1:49
 Blue Bell (Adcock, Duffey) 2:28
 It's All Over Now, Baby Blue (Dylan) 3:26
 Matterhorn (Danny Dill, Mel Tills) 2:18
 Dark As a Dungeon (Merle Travis) 3:32
 Big Bruce (John Duffey) 2:48

Disc 2
 When They Ring Those Golden Bells (Traditional) 2:58
 Buffalo Gals (Traditional) 2:06
 A Beautiful Life (Golden) 2:42
 I'm Working On A Road (Lester Flatt) 2:51
 A Border Affair (Clark, Williams) 3:20
 Johnny Reb (Merle Kilgore) 2:34
 Many A Mile (Bill Sky) 2:18
 Amelia Earhart's Last Flight (David McEnery) 2:31
 Lord, I'm Coming Home (Traditional) 3:47
 The Traveler (John Duffey) 3:12
 Silver Bell (Traditional) 1:57
 Theme From Exodus (Ernest Gold) 2:47
 Love and Wealth (Ira Louvin, Charlie Louvin) 2:41
 He Was a Friend of Mine (Traditional) 3:00
 Daybreak In Dixie (Bill Napier) 2:01
 Some Old Day (Louise Certain, Gladys Stacey) 2:32
 Raggy Mountain Shakedown (John Duffey) 2:08
 Banana Boat Song (Attaway, Burgess) 2:41
 Going to the Races (John Duffey) 1:48
 Waiting for the Boys to Come Home (Presley) 2:25
 Darling Little Joe (A.P. Carter) 2:40
 El Dedo (Eddie Adcock) 2:57
 I'll Be There Mary Dear (Harry Von Tilzer, Andrew Sterling) 3:11
 Blue Ridge Cabin Home (Louise Certain, Gladys Stacey) 2:29
 Take Me In a Lifeboat (Frank Southern) 2:41
 The Sentence (Eddie Adcock) 2:40
 Where I'm Bound 2:20 (Tom Paxton)

Disc 3
 To the Rescue (Eddie Adcock) 2:55
 Rodger Young (Frank Loesser) 2:30
 Green, Green Grass of Home (Claude Putman) 2:36
 Along the Way (John Duffey) 2:51
 Let's (Eddie Adcock) 2:22
 Rambling Boy (Tom Paxton) 3:22
 Gentlemen's Concerto (Jimmy Gaudreau) 2:31
 Take Me Back to the Valley (Traditional) 4:02
 Fare-Thee-Well Cisco (Tom Paxton) 2:11
 Preaching, Praying, Singing (McCarty) 1:45
 Mrs. Robinson (Paul Simon) 3:10
 Two Little Boys (Traditional) 2:51
 Doin' My Time (Jimmie Skinner) 3:10
 Rank Strangers (Albert Brumley) 3:03
 Heaven (McSpadden) 2:54
 Gone Home (Bill Carlisle) 2:06
 Rank Strangers (Albert Brumley) 2:57
 I'm Using My Bible for a Roadmap (Don Reno, Charles Schroeder) 2:54
 Over The Hills To The Poorhouse (Braham, Catlin) 2:55
 Little White Church (Wellman) 2:11
 Heaven (McSpadden) 2:56
 Bill Bailey (Hughie Cannon) 1:56
 He Will Set Your Fields On Fire 2:28
 Are You Washed In the Blood (Elisha Hoffman) 2:30
 One Wide River (Traditional) 1:40
 On The Sunny Side of Life (Traditional) 2:20
 Born Again (Louvin) 2:12
 I'll Break Out Again Tonight (A.L. Owens, Sanger Shafer) 3:08

Disc 4
 Less of Me (Campbell) 2:00
 I Am a Pilgrim (Merle Travis) 2:15
 Weapon of Prayer (Louvin) 3:20
 If I Were Free (Edmonson) 3:37
 Teach Your Children (Graham Nash) 2:34
 Fox on the Run (Tony Hazzard) 2:32
 Johnny and Jack Medley 3:13
 I'd Rather Live By the Side of the Road (Albert Brumley) 3:10
 These Men of God (Ellis, Williams) 2:22
 Cowboys and Indians (Bill Emerson) 1:55
 Sea of Heartbreak (Hal David, Hampton) 2:51
 Orange Blossom Mandolin (Ervin Rouse) 3:09
 Yesterday (John Lennon, Paul McCartney) 3:16
 The Girl Behind the Bar (Stanley) 2:59
 The Son of Hickory Holler's Tramp (Dallas Frazier) 2:31
 Take Me Home, Country Roads (Bill Danoff, John Denver, Taffy Nivert) 2:31
 Redwood Hill (Gordon Lightfoot) 2:38
 Secret of the Waterfall (Jake Landers) 3:06
 Walkin' Down the Line (Bob Dylan) 2:04
 Breakin' It Down (Bill Emerson) 2:23
 New Freedom Bell (Osborne) 2:40
 The Old Pine Tree (Grant) 3:04
 The Legend of the Rebel Soldier (Charlie Moore) 2:55
 C.G. Express (Doyle Lawson) 2:23
 Little Bessie (Traditional) 3:34
 The Fields Have Turned Brown (Stanley) 3:00
 Get in Line Buddy (Bill Yates) 2:13

Previously unreleased tracks
From the 110 tracks, released on this collection, were the following, which were not previously released:
 The Convict and the Rose
 Uncle Joe
 Silver Bell
 Love and Wealth
 Heaven

Personnel
 Charlie Waller - guitar, vocals
 Rick Allred - mandolin, vocals
 Bill Emerson - banjo, vocals
 Eddie Adcock - banjo, guitar, vocals
 Bill Yates - bass, vocals
 John Duffey - mandolin, guitar
 Jimmy Gaudreau - mandolin, guitar
 Doyle Lawson - mandolin, violin, guitar, vocals
 Mike Auldridge - Dobro
 Tom Gray - bass, vocals
 Len Holsclaw - bass
 Ed Ferris - bass
 Ed McGlothlin - bass
 Bill Yates - bass
 Bobbi Woods - tambourine
 Pete Kuykendall - guitar
 Ray Marshall - vibes

References

External links
 

The Country Gentlemen compilation albums
1998 compilation albums
Rebel Records compilation albums